Eucalyptus fruticosa is a species of mallee that is endemic to Western Australia. It has rough, fibrous or flaky bark on the trunk, sometimes also on the larger branches, smooth pale brownish bark above, linear to narrow elliptical adult leaves, flower buds in groups of between seven and eleven, white to cream-coloured flowers and barrel-shaped to shortened spherical fruit.

Description
It has rough fibrous or flaky bark on the trunk, sometimes extending to the larger branches, smooth pale brown bark shedding in ribbons above. Flowering occurs between January and May and the flowers are white to cream-coloured.

Taxonomy and naming
The specific epithet (fruticosa) is derived from a Latin word meaning "shrubby", referring to the habit of this species.

Distribution and habitat
This mallee grows in red sandy soils on sand plains, sand dunes and calcareous hills in open shrubland along the coast of Western Australia from south of Exmouth Gulf to south of Shark Bay.

Conservation status
This eucalypt is classified as "not threatened" by the Western Australian Government Department of Parks and Wildlife.

See also
List of Eucalyptus species

References

Eucalypts of Western Australia
fruticosa
Myrtales of Australia
Plants described in 1979
Taxa named by Ian Brooker